Maria Tavares may refer to:

 Maria Tavares (artist) (born 1965), Portuguese artist and art teacher
 Maria Odeth Tavares (born 1976), Angolan handball goalkeeper
 Maria Leonor Tavares (born 1985), French-born Portuguese pole vaulter
 Maria da Conceição Tavares, Portuguese naturalized Brazilian economist